The 1966 New Hampshire gubernatorial election was held on November 8, 1966. Incumbent Democrat John W. King defeated Republican nominee Hugh Gregg with 53.88% of the vote.

Primary elections
Primary elections were held on September 13, 1966.

Republican primary

Candidates
Hugh Gregg, former Governor
James J. Barry
Alexander M. Taft
William Maynard
Peter R. Lessard
Elmer E. Bussey

Results

General election

Candidates
John W. King, Democratic
Hugh Gregg, Republican

Results

References

1966
New Hampshire
Gubernatorial